Domingo Okorie was a Nigerian professor of chemistry and secretary of the Nigerian Academy of Science. He died in Ibadan on 6th January 2023.

References

Nigerian chemists
Year of birth missing (living people)
Place of birth missing (living people)